Redditch Borough Council is the local authority covering the non-metropolitan district centred on the town of Redditch.

History
The town of Redditch was governed by a local board of health from 1858 until 1894, when such local boards were reformed to become urban district councils. The urban district in turn was abolished in 1974 and replaced by a non-metropolitan district council covering the same area as the former urban district, but with different powers and responsibilities. The Redditch district was awarded borough status on 15 May 1980, changing the council's name to Redditch Borough Council and allowing the chair of the council to take the title of mayor.

Political control

In 2022 the Conservative Party held control of the council.

Councillors

References

Local government in Worcestershire
Non-metropolitan district councils of England
Borough Council